Renée Massip, (31 Mars 1907 - 21 March 2002) was a French writer and journalist. She was the winner of the 1963 Prix Interallié and member of the jury of the Prix Femina.

Early life and education
Massip (née Renée Castaing) was born in south-western France, in the Pyrénées-Atlantiques department. Her parents were school principals. Her home town was Arette. She attended the École Normale in Pau, studying history and literature.

Career
Massip married the French journalist Roger Massip, and from 1931 to 1937, followed her husband who was then a French newspaper correspondent in Romania and Poland. In 1939, she became a journalist, and joined the desk of Havas, a French news and advertising agency. She lived in Lyon during World War II.

Massip worked for the French newspapers France-Soir and the literary section of Le Figaro. She was a permanent member of the French literary prize Prix Femina committee from 1972 to 1996.

Massip has written a dozen books, including Douce Lumiere, La Regente, and La Vie Absente.  In 1963 she published La Bête quaternaire, for which she received the Prix Interallié, and Le Rire de Sara for which she won the Grand Prize of the Catholic Novel in 1966.

Books
 1945: L'Odyssée comporte un retour
 1954: La Régente
 1956: La Petite Anglaise
 1958: Les Déesses
 1963  La Bête quaternaire - prix Interallié
 1961: 'La Main paternelle
 1966:  Le Rire de Sara - Grand prix catholique de littérature 1967
 1967: L'Aventure du lièvre blanc
 1969: Les Torts réciproques
 1970: L'Entente du couple
 1971: À la santé de Dieu
 1973: La Vie absente
 1974: La Femme et l'Amitié
 1976: Qu'avez-vous fait de lui
 1977: Le Chat de Briarres
 1979: Belle à jamais.
 1981: Les Passants du siècle

References

External links 
Renée Massip at WorldCat

People from Béarn
1907 births
2002 deaths
20th-century French non-fiction writers
Prix Interallié winners
20th-century French women writers